Brigadier Nicholas Crespigny Laurence Vivian, 6th Baron Vivian (11 December 1935 – 28 February 2004), was a British peer and soldier from the Vivian family. He was one of the hereditary peers elected to remain in the House of Lords after the passing of the House of Lords Act 1999, sitting as a Conservative.

Early life
The son of the 5th Baron Vivian and Victoria Ruth Mary Rosamund (née Oliphant), Nicholas was educated at Ludgrove School, then at Eton College in Berkshire and Madrid University, where he received a diploma in Spanish Literature, History and Culture.

Biography

Military career
In 1955, Vivian was commissioned to the 3rd Carabiniers (Army Emergency Reserve), which later merged with the Royal Scots Greys into the Royal Scots Dragoon Guards.

In 1957 he transferred to a Regular Army commission. From 1976, he commanded the 16th/5th The Queen's Royal Lancers. Having then worked for defence intelligence staff at the UK Ministry of Defence, Vivian became deputy commander of the land forces in Cyprus in 1984. Elevated to the rank of Brigadier in 1987, he commanded the British Communication Zone until 1990, when he stepped down. Shortly after this, he was promoted Honorary Colonel of 306 Field Hospital, Territorial Army.

Political career
In 1991, Vivian succeeded to his father's titles and joined the House of Lords, where he was Shadow Minister for Defence. Between 1994 and 2000, he was Commissioner for the Royal Hospital, Chelsea.

Personal life
Vivian married firstly Catherine Joyce Hope, daughter of James Kenneth Hope, on 13 December 1960. Being divorced in 1972, he married secondly Carol Martineau (1939–2013), daughter of Frederick Alan Martineau, in 1972.

He had one son, Charles (7th Baron Vivian) and one daughter, Henrietta (married to Philip Hoyland. Children: Jack, Francesca, George), by his first wife, and two daughters by his second wife, Natasha (married to Jamie Piggott. Children: Harry, Jemima, Olivia, Florence) and Camilla (married to William Wallace. Children: Agatha, George).

References

1935 births
2004 deaths
Barons in the Peerage of the United Kingdom
Conservative Party (UK) hereditary peers
16th/5th The Queen's Royal Lancers officers
3rd Carabiniers officers
Royal Scots Dragoon Guards officers
People educated at Eton College
Nicholas
Eldest sons of British hereditary barons
People educated at Ludgrove School

Hereditary peers elected under the House of Lords Act 1999